Heřmanice is a municipality and village in Náchod District in the Hradec Králové Region of the Czech Republic. It has about 500 inhabitants.

Administrative parts
Villages of Běluň, Brod and Slotov are administrative parts of Heřmanice.

Notable people
Albrecht von Wallenstein (1583–1634), military leader and statesman

References

Villages in Náchod District